The Mominpura Graveyard is a Shia cemetery in Lahore, Pakistan. It is one of the oldest graveyards in Lahore, and contains over 10,000 burials according to its records. Many graves are hundreds of years old. Established by the Qizilbash family, the cemetery is situated near the Lakshmi Chowk, opposite Empire Cinema.

History 
On 11 January 1998 (8.15am PST), unidentified gunmen stormed the graveyard and opened fire on a congregation of people offering prayers. The attack, believed to be motivated by sectarianism, resulted in 22 deaths and 51 injuries. Sunni militants were blamed for the massacre. The shooting was condemned by Punjab's chief minister Shahbaz Sharif as a "most heinous and inhuman act of terrorism."

Notable burials 
Several notable individuals are buried here, including first home secretary of Punjab Syed Ahmad Ali, film director Qamar Zaidi, Nasir Kazmi, Sayyid Sajjad Rizvi, Mushaf Ali Mir, singer Asad Amanat Ali Khan and music composer Wajahat Attre.

References

Lahore
Shia Islam in Pakistan
Cemeteries in Lahore